Field hockey events were contested at the 1982 Asian Games in New Delhi, India.

Medalists

Medal table

Results

Men's tournament

Preliminary round

Group A

Group B

Women's tournament

References

Results Men
Results Women

 
1982 Asian Games events
1982
Asian Games
1982 Asian Games